Dubiaranea is a genus of dwarf spiders that was first described by Cândido Firmino de Mello-Leitão in 1943.

Species
 it contains one hundred species found throughout South America, except one found on Borneo:
D. abjecta Millidge, 1991 – Ecuador, Peru
D. abundans Millidge, 1991 – Peru
D. affinis Millidge, 1991 – Ecuador
D. albodorsata Millidge, 1991 – Colombia
D. albolineata Millidge, 1991 – Peru
D. amoena Millidge, 1991 – Peru
D. argentata Millidge, 1991 – Bolivia
D. argenteovittata Mello-Leitão, 1943 (type) – Brazil
D. atra Millidge, 1991 – Bolivia
D. atriceps Millidge, 1991 – Peru
D. atripalpis Millidge, 1991 – Venezuela
D. atrolineata Millidge, 1991 – Colombia
D. aureola Millidge, 1991 – Peru
D. bacata Millidge, 1991 – Peru
D. brevis Millidge, 1991 – Bolivia
D. caeca Millidge, 1991 – Venezuela
D. caledonica (Millidge, 1985) – Chile
D. castanea Millidge, 1991 – Peru
D. cekalovici (Millidge, 1985) – Chile
D. cerea (Millidge, 1985) – Chile
D. colombiana Millidge, 1991 – Colombia
D. concors Millidge, 1991 – Colombia
D. congruens Millidge, 1991 – Ecuador
D. crebra Millidge, 1991 – Colombia, Venezuela, Ecuador, Peru
D. decora Millidge, 1991 – Peru
D. decurtata Millidge, 1991 – Bolivia
D. deelemanae Millidge, 1995 – Borneo
D. difficilis (Mello-Leitão, 1944) – Argentina
D. discolor Millidge, 1991 – Colombia
D. distincta (Nicolet, 1849) – Chile
D. distracta Millidge, 1991 – Colombia
D. elegans Millidge, 1991 – Peru
D. fagicola Millidge, 1991 – Chile
D. falcata (Millidge, 1985) – Chile
D. festiva (Millidge, 1985) – Chile
D. fruticola Millidge, 1991 – Peru
D. fulgens (Millidge, 1985) – Chile
D. fulvolineata Millidge, 1991 – Peru
D. furva Millidge, 1991 – Peru
D. fusca Millidge, 1991 – Peru
D. gilva Millidge, 1991 – Colombia
D. gloriosa Millidge, 1991 – Colombia
D. grandicula Millidge, 1991 – Peru
D. gregalis Millidge, 1991 – Peru
D. habilis Millidge, 1991 – Ecuador
D. inquilina (Millidge, 1985) – Brazil
D. insignita Millidge, 1991 – Peru, Bolivia
D. insulana Millidge, 1991 – Chile (Juan Fernandez Is.)
D. insulsa Millidge, 1991 – Ecuador
D. lepida Millidge, 1991 – Peru
D. levii Millidge, 1991 – Brazil
D. longa Millidge, 1991 – Peru
D. longiscapa (Millidge, 1985) – Chile
D. luctuosa Millidge, 1991 – Peru
D. lugubris Millidge, 1991 – Ecuador
D. maculata (Millidge, 1985) – Chile
D. manufera (Millidge, 1985) – Chile
D. margaritata Millidge, 1991 – Colombia, Venezuela
D. media Millidge, 1991 – Venezuela
D. mediocris Millidge, 1991 – Peru
D. melanocephala Millidge, 1991 – Peru
D. melica Millidge, 1991 – Peru
D. mirabilis Millidge, 1991 – Ecuador
D. modica Millidge, 1991 – Ecuador
D. morata Millidge, 1991 – Ecuador
D. nivea Millidge, 1991 – Bolivia
D. opaca Millidge, 1991 – Peru
D. orba Millidge, 1991 – Ecuador
D. ornata Millidge, 1991 – Colombia
D. penai (Millidge, 1985) – Chile
D. persimilis Millidge, 1991 – Ecuador
D. procera Millidge, 1991 – Peru
D. propinquua (Millidge, 1985) – Chile
D. propria Millidge, 1991 – Colombia
D. proxima Millidge, 1991 – Ecuador
D. pulchra Millidge, 1991 – Venezuela
D. pullata Millidge, 1991 – Peru
D. remota Millidge, 1991 – Argentina
D. rufula Millidge, 1991 – Peru
D. saucia Millidge, 1991 – Brazil
D. setigera Millidge, 1991 – Colombia
D. signifera Millidge, 1991 – Bolivia
D. silvae Millidge, 1991 – Peru
D. silvicola Millidge, 1991 – Colombia
D. similis Millidge, 1991 – Chile
D. solita Millidge, 1991 – Colombia
D. speciosa Millidge, 1991 – Peru
D. stellata (Millidge, 1985) – Chile
D. subtilis (Keyserling, 1886) – Peru
D. teres Millidge, 1991 – Ecuador
D. tridentata Millidge, 1993 – Peru
D. tristis (Mello-Leitão, 1941) – Argentina
D. truncata Millidge, 1991 – Peru
D. turbidula (Keyserling, 1886) – Brazil, Peru
D. usitata Millidge, 1991 – Colombia
D. varia Millidge, 1991 – Peru
D. variegata Millidge, 1991 – Colombia
D. versicolor Millidge, 1991 – Colombia, Ecuador, Peru
D. veterana Millidge, 1991 – Ecuador
D. vetusta Millidge, 1991 – Ecuador

See also
 List of Linyphiidae species (A–H)

References

Araneomorphae genera
Linyphiidae
Spiders of Asia
Spiders of South America
Taxa named by Cândido Firmino de Mello-Leitão